James Clavell (born Charles Edmund Dumaresq Clavell; 10 October 1921 – 7 September 1994) was an Australian-born British (later naturalized American) writer, screenwriter, director, and World War II veteran and prisoner of war. Clavell is best known as the author of his Asian Saga novels, a number of which have had television adaptations. Clavell also wrote such screenplays as those for The Fly  (1958) (based on the short story by George Langelaan) and The Great Escape (1963) (based on the personal account of Paul Brickhill). He directed the popular 1967 film To Sir, with Love for which he also wrote the script.

Biography

Early life
Born in Australia, Clavell was the son of Commander Richard Charles Clavell, a Royal Navy officer who was stationed in Australia with the Royal Australian Navy from 1920 to 1922.  Richard Clavell was posted back to England when James was nine months old.  Clavell was educated at Portsmouth Grammar School.

World War II
In 1940, Clavell joined the Royal Artillery. Though trained for desert warfare, after the attack on Pearl Harbor in December 1941 he was sent to Singapore to fight the Japanese. The ship taking his unit was sunk en route to Singapore, and the survivors were picked up by a Dutch boat fleeing to India. The commander, described by Clavell years later as a "total twit", insisted that they be dropped off at the nearest port to fight the war despite having no weapons.

Imprisoned in Changi 
Shot in the face, he was captured in  Java in 1942 and sent to a Japanese prisoner of war camp on Java. Later he was transferred to Changi Prison in Singapore.

In 1981, Clavell recounted:

Changi became my university instead of my prison. Among the inmates there were experts in all walks of life—the high and the low roads. I studied and absorbed everything I could from physics to counterfeiting, but most of all I learned the art of surviving, the most important course of all.

Prisoners were fed a quarter of a pound of rice per day, one egg per week and occasional vegetables.  Clavell believed that if atomic bombs had not been dropped on Hiroshima and Nagasaki he would not have survived the war.

Clavell did not talk about his wartime experiences with anyone, even his wife, for 15 years after the war. For a time he carried a can of sardines in his pocket at all times and fought an urge to forage for food in trash cans. He also experienced bad dreams and a nervous stomach kept him awake at night.

Post-war career
By 1946 Clavell had become a captain, but a motorcycle accident ended his military career. He enrolled with the University of Birmingham, where he met April Stride, an actress, whom he married in 1949 (date of marriage sometimes given as 1951). He would visit her on the film sets where she was working and began to be interested in becoming a film director.

Early work on films
Clavell entered the film industry via distribution and worked at that in England for a number of years. He tried to get into producing but had no luck so started writing screenplays. In 1954 he moved to New York, then to Hollywood. While trying to break into screenwriting he paid the bills working as a carpenter.

In 1956, he sold a script about pilots to RKO, Far Alert. The same year Michael Pate bought a story of his, Forbidden Territory, for filming.

Neither was filmed but Far Alert kept being sold and re-sold. "In 18 months it brought in $87,000", he later said. "We kept getting paid for writing it and rewriting it as it went from one studio to another. It was wonderful." It was later sold to Fox where it attracted the attention of Robert L. Lippert who hired Clavell to write the science-fiction horror movie The Fly (1958). This became a hit and launched Clavell as a screenwriter.

He wrote Watusi (1959) for director Kurt Neumann, who had also made The Fly.

Clavell wrote Five Gates to Hell (1959) for Lippert, and when they could not find a suitable director, Clavell was given the job.

Paramount hired Clavell to write a film about the Bounty mutineers. It ended up not being made. Neither was a proposed movie about Francis Gary Powers made. Clavell did write, produce, and direct a Western at Paramount, Walk Like a Dragon (1960).

In 1959, Clavell wrote  "Moon Landing" and "First Woman in the Moon", two episodes of Men into Space, a "day after tomorrow"-style science fiction drama, which depicted, in realistic terms, the (at the time) near future of space exploration.

In 1960, he had written a Broadway show with John Sturges, White Alice, a thriller set in the Arctic. It was never produced.

Early prose and screenplay work
In 1960, the Writers Guild went on strike, meaning Clavell was unable to work. He decided to write a novel, King Rat, based on his time at Changi. It took him three months and several more months after that to rework it. The book was published in 1962 and sold well. It was turned into a film in 1965.

In 1961, Clavell announced he had formed his own company, Cee Productions, who would make the films King Rat, White Alice and No Hands on the Clock.

In 1962, he signed a multi picture contract with a Canadian company to produce and direct two films there, Circle of Greed and The Sweet and the Bitter. Only the second was made and it was not released until 1967.

He wrote scripts for the war films The Great Escape (1963) and 633 Squadron (1964).

He wrote a short story, "The Children's Story" (1964) and the script for The Satan Bug (1965), directed by John Sturges who had made The Great Escape. He also wrote Richard Sahib for Sturges which was never made.

Clavell wanted to write a second novel because "that separates the men from the boys". The money from King Rat enabled him to spend two years researching and then writing what became Tai-Pan (1966). It was a huge best-seller, and Clavell sold the film rights for a sizeable amount (although the film would not be made until 1986).

Leading film director
Clavell returned to filmmaking. He wrote, produced and directed To Sir, With Love (1967), featuring Sidney Poitier and based on E. R. Braithwaite's semiautobiographical 1959 book. It was a huge critical and commercial success.

Clavell was now in much demand as a filmmaker. He produced and directed Where's Jack? (1969), a highwayman film which was a commercial failure. So too was an epic film about the Thirty Years' War, The Last Valley (1971).

Career as novelist
Clavell returned to novel writing, which was the focus of the remainder of his career. He spent three years researching and writing Shōgun (1975), about an Englishman who becomes a samurai in feudal Japan. It was another massive best seller. Clavell was heavily involved in the 1980 miniseries which starred Richard Chamberlain and achieved huge ratings.

In the late 1970s he spent three years researching and writing his fourth novel, Noble House (1981), set in Hong Kong in 1963. It was another best seller and was turned into a miniseries in 1986.

Clavell briefly returned to filmmaking and directed a thirty-minute adaptation of his novelette The Children's Story. He was meant to do a sequel to Shogun but instead wrote a novel about the 1979 revolution in Iran, Whirlwind (1986).

Clavell eventually returned to the Shogun sequel, writing Gai-Jin (1993). This was his last completed novel.

Films
 The Fly (1958) (writer)
 Watusi (1959) (writer)
 Five Gates to Hell (1959) (writer, director and producer)
 Walk Like a Dragon (1960) (writer, director and producer)
 The Great Escape (1963) (co-writer)
 633 Squadron (1964) (co-writer)
 The Satan Bug (1965) (co-writer)
 King Rat (1965) (based on his novel)
 To Sir, with Love (1967) (writer, director and co-producer)
 The Sweet and the Bitter (1967) (writer and director)
 Where's Jack? (1968) (director and co-producer)
 The Last Valley (1970) (writer, director and producer)
 Shōgun TV miniseries (1980) (executive producer, based on his novel)
 Tai-Pan (1986) (based on his novel)
 Noble House TV miniseries (1988) (executive producer, based on his novel)

Novelist
The New York Times said that "Clavell has a gift. It may be something that cannot be taught or earned. He breathes narrative ... He writes in the oldest and grandest tradition that fiction knows". His first novel, King Rat (1962), was a semi-fictional account of his prison experiences at Changi. When the book was published it became an immediate best-seller, and three years later it was adapted as a movie. His next novel, Tai-Pan (1966), was a fictional account of Jardine Matheson's successful career in Hong Kong, as told via the character who was to become Clavell's heroic archetype, Dirk Struan. Struan's descendants were characters in almost all of his following books. Tai-Pan was adapted as a movie in 1986.

Clavell's third novel, Shōgun (1975), is set in 17th century Japan, and it tells the story of a shipwrecked English navigator in Japan, based on that of William Adams. When the story was made into a TV miniseries in 1980, produced by Clavell, it became the second highest rated miniseries in history with an audience of more than 120 million, after Roots.

Clavell's fourth novel, Noble House (1981), became a best-seller that year and was adapted into a TV miniseries in 1988.

Following the success of Noble House, Clavell wrote Thrump-o-moto (1985), Whirlwind (1986), and Gai-Jin (1993).

Peter Marlowe
Peter Marlowe is Clavell's author surrogate and a character of the novels King Rat and Noble House (1981); he is also mentioned once (as a friend of Andrew Gavallan's) in Whirlwind (1986).  Featured most prominently in King Rat, Marlowe is an English prisoner of war in Changi Prison during World War II. In Noble House, set two decades later, he is a novelist researching a book about Hong Kong.  Marlowe's ancestors are also mentioned in other Clavell novels.

In Noble House Marlowe is mentioned as having written a novel about Changi which, although fictionalised, is based on real events (like those in King Rat). When asked which character was based on him, Marlowe answers, "Perhaps I'm not there at all", although in a later scene, he admits he was "the hero, of course".

Novels
The Asian Saga consists of seven novels:

 King Rat (1962), set in a Japanese POW camp in Singapore in 1945.
 Tai-Pan (1966), set in Hong Kong in 1841
 Shōgun (1975), set in Japan from 1600 onwards
 Noble House (1981), set in Hong Kong in 1963
 Whirlwind (1986), set in Iran in 1979.
 Gai-Jin (1993), set in Japan in 1862
 Escape: The Love Story from Whirlwind (1994), a novella adapted from Whirlwind (1986)

Children's stories
 "The Children's Story" (1964 Reader's Digest short story; adapted as a movie and reprinted as a standalone book in 1981)
 Thrump-O-Moto (1986), illustrated by George Sharp

Nonfiction
 The Art of War (1983), a translation of Sun Tzu's book.

Interactive fiction
Shōgun (1988 adaptation by Infocom, Inc., for Amiga, Apple II, DOS, Macintosh), interactive fiction with graphics and puzzle-solving; the user plays John Blackthorne, the first Englishman to set foot on Japanese soil
Shōgun (1986 adaptation by Virgin Games, Ltd., for Amstrad CPC, Commodore 64, DOS), interactive fiction with a third-person perspective; the user wanders around as one of a number of characters trying to improve his/her rapport with other people, battling and working to becoming a Shōgun

Taipan! is a 1979 turn-based strategy computer game written for the TRS-80 and ported to the Apple II in 1982. It was created by Art Canfil and the company Mega Micro Computers, and published by Avalanche Productions. The game Taipan! was inspired by the novel Tai-Pan by James Clavell.

Politics and later life
In 1963 Clavell became a naturalised citizen of the United States. Politically, he was said to have been an ardent individualist and proponent of laissez-faire capitalism, as many of his books' heroes exemplify. Clavell admired Ayn Rand, founder of the Objectivist school of philosophy, and sent her a copy of Noble House during 1981 inscribed: "This is for Ayn Rand—one of the real, true talents on this earth for which many, many thanks. James C, New York, 2 September 81." Between 1970 and 1990, Clavell lived at Fredley Manor near Mickleham, located in Surrey in South East England.

Death
In 1994, Clavell died in Switzerland from a stroke while suffering from cancer. He died one month before his 73rd birthday. After sponsorship by his widow, the library and archive of the Royal Artillery Museum at the Royal Arsenal, Woolwich, in southeast London, was renamed the James Clavell Library in his honour. The library was later closed pending the opening of a new facility in Salisbury, Wiltshire; however, James Clavell Square on the Royal Arsenal development on Woolwich riverside remains.

References

External links

 
 Photos of the filming The Great Escape 
 New publication with private photos of the shooting & documents of 2nd unit cameraman Walter Riml 
 

1921 births
1994 deaths
20th-century American male writers
20th-century American novelists
20th-century American screenwriters
20th-century Australian novelists
Alumni of the University of Birmingham
American film directors
American male novelists
American male screenwriters
Australian expatriates in Switzerland
Australian male novelists
British Army personnel of World War II
British emigrants to the United States
British expatriates in Switzerland
British historical novelists
British male novelists
British people of Australian descent
Deaths from cancer in Switzerland
Naturalized citizens of the United States
Objectivists
Royal Artillery officers
World War II prisoners of war held by Japan
Writers from Sydney
Writers of historical fiction set in the early modern period
British shooting survivors
Australian shooting survivors
American shooting survivors
People educated at The Portsmouth Grammar School